Tylea is an Australian singer and songwriter. She started out as a solo performer, releasing the EPs Bellowing Flower (1994) and Tylea with a T in 1997, and went on to become the singer and guitarist for Gota Cola. After Gota Cola took a break she released a self-titled EP in 2003 with Tylea and the Imaginary Music Score, a band featuring Magoo and Marcel Lip. Her 2005 debut solo album Colour Your Insecurities was a double album with two CDs of Light and Dark songs.

Tylea has a daughter, Chorus, with husband Lachlan "Magoo" Goold.

Discography
Bellowing Flower EP (1994)
Tylea with a T EP (1997)
Tylea and the Imaginary Music Score EP (2003)
Colour Your Insecurities (2005)

References

Year of birth missing (living people)
Living people
Australian women guitarists
Australian singer-songwriters
Australian women singer-songwriters